Vladislavs Gabovs (born 13 July 1987) is Latvian football right-back who plays for Salaspils and the Latvia national football team.

Club career
As a youth player Gabovs played for Rīgas Futbola skola, being taken to Multibanka Rīga in 2003. With 15 matches, the youngster helped the team finish the season as the runners-up of the Latvian First League. At the beginning of 2004 Gabovs joined Auda Rīga, making his debut in the Latvian Higher League. In the top flight debut season with 20 matches and 1 goal, Gabovs saw Auda being relegated after finishing the season at the bottom of the table. Despite the club's relegation Gabovs found his way to stay in the top league by joining the newly established club Olimps Rīga in early 2005. He helped the newcomers finish 7th in the league table as well as reach the semi-finals of the Latvian Cup.

At the beginning of 2006 Gabovs moved abroad, joining the Estonian Meistriliiga side TVMK Tallinn at the age of 19. During his first season in Tallinn Gabovs helped the club lift the Estonian Cup as well as the Estonian Supercup. In July 2006 he made his debut in the UEFA Champions League, coming on against the Icelandic club Fimleikafélag Hafnarfjarðar. In 2007 Gabovs became a bronze medalist of the Estonian championship together with TVMK.

In March 2008 Gabovs signed a two-year contract with Daugava Daugavpils, returning to the Latvian Higher League. During the same season Daugava managed to win the Latvian Cup for the first time in the club's history. After the regular season Gabovs was included in the esports.lv team of the season. Following the merging of Daugava Daugavpils and Dinaburg Daugavpils at the beginning of 2009, Gabovs established himself a place in the first eleven, with the club continuing to play under the name of Dinaburg. During summer the same year Gabovs went on trials with the Belarusian Premier League club BATE Borisov and the Ukrainian Premier League side Hoverla Uzhorod, but did not stay with either of them.

On 5 October 2009 Dinaburg was disqualified from the Latvian Higher League suspected of match fixing. On 8 January 2010 Latvian Football Federation, furthermore, conditionally disqualified 13 of the club's players, one of whom was also Gabovs. His involvement in match fixing though was never proven and in February 2010 Gabovs went on trial with FK Ventspils, signing a contract with them for two years. In 2010, he helped the club finish the domestic league as runners-up and also lifted the Baltic League trophy. In 2011 Gabovs became the champion of Latvia, won the Latvian Cup and once again participated in the final of the Baltic League, where Ventspils lost to Gabovs' future club Skonto Rīga. After the 2011 season Gabovs was included in the LFF Latvian Higher League Team of the Tournament.

At the end of 2011 Gabovs suffered a serious injury, breaking his leg and being out of football for several months. In order to recover and reestablish himself as a first eleven player he joined METTA/Latvijas Universitāte, helping the club retain a place in the top tier of Latvian football in the 2012 season. His overall performance was praised by the club officials and Gabovs was nominated as one of the candidates for the METTA/Latvijas Universitāte Player of the Year award.

In February 2013 Gabovs moved to his former club's rivals and one of Latvia's top clubs Skonto Rīga, establishing himself in the first eleven soon after joining. In 2013, he helped the club finish the league as the runners-up with only one loss throughout the whole season. Furthermore, Skonto participated considerably well in the UEFA Europa League qualification, beating the Moldovan club FC Tiraspol on aggregate and the Czech side Slovan Liberec at home. In January 2014 Gabovs went on trial with the English Football League Championship club Blackpool, but due to managerial change at the time he was refused a place in the team. After the retirement of midfielder Juris Laizāns, Gabovs was elected as Skonto Rīga new captain for the upcoming season. Under his captaincy the club reached the Latvian Cup final, losing to FK Jelgava in penalties. Disregarding Skonto's immense financial problems, long-term debts, unpaid wages and sanctions from the Latvian Football Federation the club finished the 2014 season with Gabovs playing a substantial role in the right-back position.

International career
Gabovs was a member of Latvia U-17, Latvia U-19 and Latvia U-21 football teams. On 15 November 2008 he was called up to the Latvia national football team reserves for a friendly match against Skonto Rīga. Gabovs made his full international debut on 24 May 2013, coming on as a substitute in the 74th minute and replacing Ritvars Rugins in the friendly match against Qatar. In May 2014 he helped Latvia win the Baltic Cup for the second time in a row. Gabovs established himself as a first eleven player in the following matches of the UEFA Euro 2016 qualification.

Honours
 Latvian Higher League champion: 2011
 Baltic League champion: 2009–10
 Latvian Cup winner: 2008, 2010–11
 Estonian Cup winner: 2006
 Estonian Supercup winner: 2006
 Baltic Cup winner: 2014

Personal life
While playing for FS METTA/Latvijas Universitāte, Gabovs was studying at the University of Latvia Faculty of Physics and Mathematics and his training schedule was subordinated to the studies.

References

External links
 
 
 
 

1987 births
Living people
Latvian footballers
Latvian expatriate footballers
Footballers from Riga
Association football defenders
Latvia international footballers
FK Auda players
JFK Olimps players
FC TVMK players
FC Daugava players
Dinaburg FC players
FK Ventspils players
FS METTA/Latvijas Universitāte players
Skonto FC players
FC Sokol Saratov players
Korona Kielce players
Riga FC players
Pafos FC players
FK Liepāja players
FK Jelgava players
Ekstraklasa players
Meistriliiga players
Expatriate footballers in Russia
Expatriate footballers in Poland
Expatriate footballers in Estonia
Expatriate footballers in Cyprus
Latvian expatriate sportspeople in Russia
Latvian expatriate sportspeople in Cyprus
Latvian expatriate sportspeople in Estonia
Latvian expatriate sportspeople in Poland
Esiliiga players